13 jours en France is a documentary about the 1968 Winter Olympic Games in Grenoble.

Details
Directors: Claude Lelouch and François Reichenbach
Music : Francis Lai

Awards
Official selection of the Cannes Film Festival 1968—but the screening was cancelled due to the May 1968 events, and the film did not premiere in France until December.

References

External links
 

1968 films
Films directed by Claude Lelouch
Documentary films about the Olympics
1960s sports films
Films about the 1968 Winter Olympics
French sports films
1960s French films